Emirates may refer to:

 United Arab Emirates, a Middle Eastern country
 Emirate, any territory ruled by an emir
 Gulf emirates, emirates located on the Persian Gulf
 Emirates of the United Arab Emirates, the individual emirates
 The Emirates Group, a holding company in the United Arab Emirates
 Emirates (airline), an airline subsidiary of The Emirates Group
 Emirates Foundation, an Abu Dhabi-based foundation (charity) established by Amiri decree
 Emirates Club, an association football club in the city of Ras al-Khaimah
 Emirates Club Stadium, a stadium in Ras al-Khaimah
 Emirates Scout Association, the national Scouting organization of the United Arab Emirates
 Emirates Hills, a gated community in Dubai
 E 311 road (United Arab Emirates), formerly known as "Emirates Road", a road extending between Dubai and Ras al-Khaimah
 Emirates Palace, a luxury hotel in Abu Dhabi
 Emirates (Dubai Metro), a railway station near Dubai International Airport

Towers 
 Emirates Crown, a 63-floor residential tower in the Dubai Marina in Dubai
 Emirates Park Towers Hotel & Spa, a twin-tower complex under construction in Dubai
 Emirates Towers, a complex containing the Emirates Office Tower and Jumeirah Emirates Towers Hotel skyscrapers
 Emirates Office Tower, a 54-floor office building along Sheikh Zayed Road in Dubai
 Jumeirah Emirates Towers Hotel, a 56-floor hotel tower along Sheikh Zayed Road in Dubai

Sports
 Emirates Airline Park, a rugby union/football stadium in Johannesburg
 Emirates Stadium, an association football stadium in London
 Emirates Cup, a football tournament held at Arsenal's Emirates Stadium
 Emirates Stakes, a horserace held as part of the Melbourne Cup Carnival

Others
 Emirates Air Line, former name of the London Cable Car over the River Thames in London, UK
 Emirates Floors
 Emirates Pets
 Emirates Grass
 Emirates Glass